Pago Vicario is a Spanish winery in Castilla–La Mancha, Spain. The winery uses the Vino de Pago wine appellation, a classification for Spanish wine applied to individual vineyards or wine estates, unlike the Denominación de Origen Protegida (DOP) or Denominación de Origen Calificada (DOCa) which is applied to an entire wine region. The Pago Vicario winery was formed as a Vino de Pago in 2019, and geographically it lies within the extent of the La Mancha DOP.

References

External links

Wine regions of Spain
Spanish wine
Appellations
Wine classification